Yuya Hikichi can refer to:
 Yuya Hikichi (footballer, born 1983) (挽地 祐哉) - Japanese footballer
 Yuya Hikichi (footballer, born 1990) (曵地 裕哉) - Japanese footballer